Nancy Genzel Abouke (born 5 July 2003) is a weightlifter representing Nauru, one of only two athletes representing the country in the 2020 Summer Olympics after she was given a tripartite invitation. She participated in the Women's 76 kg category finishing 10th. 

She previously won the 2019 Oceania Youth Championships at 64 kg and competed at the 2019 IWF Junior World Championships with the 5th best lift in the clean-and-jerk.

References

External links
 
 https://www.awf.com.au/statistics/lifter/id/4824

Olympic weightlifters of Nauru
Living people
2003 births
Nauruan female weightlifters
Weightlifters at the 2020 Summer Olympics
Weightlifters at the 2022 Commonwealth Games